Anaulosia is a monotypic moth genus in the subfamily Arctiinae. Its single species, Anaulosia impolita, is found in Costa Rica. Both the genus and species were first described by William Schaus in 1911.

References

Lithosiini
Monotypic moth genera
Moths of Central America